Massachusetts House of Representatives' 6th Plymouth district in the United States is one of 160 legislative districts included in the lower house of the Massachusetts General Court. It covers part of Plymouth County. Democrat Josh Cutler of Duxbury has represented the district since 2013.

Towns represented
The district includes the following localities:
 part of Duxbury
 Hanson
 Pembroke

The current district geographic boundary overlaps with those of the Massachusetts Senate's 2nd Plymouth and Bristol district, Plymouth and Barnstable district, and Plymouth and Norfolk district.

Former locales
The district previously covered:
 Carver, circa 1872 
 Plymouth, circa 1872 
 Plympton, circa 1872

Representatives
 John B. Collingwood, circa 1858 
 Rufus C. Freeman, circa 1858 
 Samuel H. Doten, circa 1859 
 Eleazer C. Sherman, circa 1859 
 Harvey H. Pratt, circa 1888 
 Frank E. Barrows, circa 1920 
 Alton Hamilton Worrall, circa 1951 
 Alfred Almeida, circa 1975 
 Charles W. Mann
 Francis L. Marini
 Daniel K. Webster
 Josh S. Cutler, 2013-current

See also
 List of Massachusetts House of Representatives elections
 Other Plymouth County districts of the Massachusetts House of Representatives: 1st, 2nd, 3rd, 4th, 5th, 7th, 8th, 9th, 10th, 11th, 12th
 List of Massachusetts General Courts
 List of former districts of the Massachusetts House of Representatives

Images
Portraits of legislators

References

External links
 Ballotpedia
  (State House district information based on U.S. Census Bureau's American Community Survey).
 League of Women Voters Plymouth Area

House
Government of Plymouth County, Massachusetts